Linh Dan Pham (born ; June 20, 1974) is a Vietnamese-born French actress.

Biography
She was born in Saigon, South Vietnam, but moved with her family to Paris, France, a year later, just before the capture of Saigon by North Vietnamese and Viet Cong forces. She has also lived in New York, The Hague, Singapore and Vietnam, and now resides in London.

She is known most for her role as an orphan of the Nguyen dynasty adopted by a French plantation owner in the 1992 Oscar-winning French epic Indochine, starring alongside Catherine Deneuve. Pham received a César nomination for most promising actress for that performance.

Despite appearing in a few other productions afterwards, Pham eventually decided to take a decade off from acting, focusing instead on her studies. She studied commerce and worked as a senior marketing manager in Vietnam after graduation.

In 2000, she married Andrew Huntley, a British investment banker whom she had met while they were both living in Ho Chi Minh City.

She began her return to film when she trained in acting at the Lee Strasberg Theatre and Film Institute in New York.

In 2005, Pham made a return to acting with her role in the BAFTA and César winning French film The Beat That My Heart Skipped, opposite Romain Duris, for which she was nominated again for the most promising actress César award (and won). Her lines are spoken in Vietnamese with a Northern accent, and though many people believe she plays a Chinese character because she is introduced by a Chinese musician friend who knows her from Beijing, in fact she plays a Vietnamese who studied music at the conservatoire in Beijing. In the film her friend claims that she can speak Chinese, Vietnamese and a little English. In reality Pham speaks French, English and Vietnamese fluently.

In that same year Pham appeared on a popular Vietnamese diaspora music variety show (Trung Tam Asia) where she was honored for her work.

In 2005, Pham moved back to Europe to pursue her acting career. Since then she has appeared in lead or supporting roles mostly in films such as Dante 01, Pars vite et reviens tard (Have Mercy on Us All), Mr. Nobody, Le Bruit des Gens Autour, Le bal des actrices and Tout ce qui brille.

She starred in her first Vietnamese production when she appeared as Cam in the 2009 film Adrift ("Chơi vơi") by the director Bui Thac Chuyen, which won the FIPRESCI award at the 66th Venice International Film Festival. The film deals with social and personal issues in modern-day Vietnam, which are not often portrayed in Vietnamese cinema, such as homosexuality and loneliness. In the film Pham speaks in Vietnamese with a fluent Northern accent.

She had a cameo role in the 2010 The Wachowskis produced action thriller Ninja Assassin, playing an assassin sent to kill the film's hero played by the Korean singer Rain.

Filmography

Theater

References

External links

 
 Linh-Dan Pham's official website

1974 births
French film actresses
Actresses of Vietnamese descent
Most Promising Actress César Award winners
Vietnamese emigrants to France
Living people
People from Ho Chi Minh City
20th-century French actresses
21st-century French actresses
French people of Vietnamese descent
Lee Strasberg Theatre and Film Institute alumni
French emigrants to the United Kingdom